Samantha Smith (born 27 November 1971) is an English former professional tennis player, who was the British ladies' No. 1 from 1996 to 1999. She now commentates on the game, predominantly for the BBC, ITV, Sky Sports, BT Sport and Eurosport and Amazon Prime as well as in Australia on the Australian Open which she has been a part of for 11 years with the Seven Network and as of 2019 the Nine Network.

Early life
Smith was born in Epping, Essex and was educated at Bancroft's School. She took three years out of tennis to attend the University of Exeter where she attained an upper second class Honours degree in history.

Tennis career
Smith competed on the WTA Tour from 1990 to 1992 and from 1995 to 2000. Her highest achievement was in reaching the fourth round at the Wimbledon Championships in 1998, when she beat Anne-Gaëlle Sidot, Mariana Díaz Oliva and former champion Conchita Martínez before losing to eventual runner up Nathalie Tauziat. In so doing she picked up an ankle injury that required her to have two operations and spend four months in plaster; this effectively ended her career. She peaked at No. 55 in the WTA rankings before the injury curtailed her climb up the rankings.

At the Australian Open, she competed in the first round of the women's doubles competition in 1992 (with Ilana Berger), and reached the second round in 1999.

At the French Open at Roland Garros, she competed in the first round in 1991 and 1999.

At Wimbledon, she competed eight times and reached the fourth round in 1998.
At the US Open, she competed in the first round in 1998 and reached the second round in 1997.
At the 1992 Barcelona Olympics she reached the second round.

Smith won a silver medal in the mixed doubles at the 1995 Universiade (World University Games) in Fukuoka, Japan, partnering Paul Robinson. She also reached the quarterfinals in the singles.

She won the ITF tournaments at Nottingham in 1995 (singles and doubles) and Frinton-on-Sea in 2000. She represented Britain in the Fed Cup and European Cup in 1991 and from 1996 to 1999. She was unbeaten in her five singles matches in the 1997 Fed Cup.

ITF finals

Singles (3–4)

Doubles (5–2)

References

External links
 
 
 

1971 births
Living people
Alumni of the University of Exeter
BBC people
British female tennis players
English sports broadcasters
Olympic tennis players of Great Britain
People from Loughton
People from Westcliff-on-Sea
Tennis commentators
Tennis players at the 1992 Summer Olympics
Universiade medalists in tennis
English female tennis players
Tennis people from Essex
Universiade silver medalists for Great Britain
Universiade bronze medalists for Great Britain
People educated at Bancroft's School
Medalists at the 1995 Summer Universiade